Lesli is a feminine given name. Notable people with the name include:

 Lesli Brea (born 1973), former Major League Baseball player
 Lesli Kay (born 1965), Emmy Award-winning American actress
 Lesli Linka Glatter (21st century), American film and television director

See also
 Lesley (disambiguation)
 Leslie (disambiguation)
 Lesly

Feminine given names